The Bristol Buckmaster was an advanced British training aircraft operated by the Royal Air Force during the 1950s.

Design and development
By 1945, there was a serious gap in performance between the so-called advanced trainers in use – such as the Avro Anson, Airspeed Oxford, dual-control Bristol Blenheim and Lockheed Hudson – and the combat aircraft which the pilots would be expected to fly on graduation.

The Bristol company's response to Air Ministry Specification T.13/43 was the Type 166 which was based on the Buckingham with a new wider front fuselage to allow side-by-side seating for an instructor and trainee and room for a radio operator. All armament and armour and military equipment was also removed. 

The Buckmaster was a propeller-driven, twin-engine mid-wing aircraft. The retractable undercarriage was of conventional (tailwheel) configuration. The radial engines were equipped with four-blade propellers.

Two partly completed Buckinghams were converted as prototypes, the first flying on the 27 October 1944. Unused sets of Buckingham components were used to produce 110 aircraft which were delivered in 1945 and 1946.

Operational history
All production aircraft were intended to serve as a trainers for the similar Brigand. It was considered the "highest performance trainer in the RAF" when introduced. Blind flying instruction and instrument training could be undertaken, the normal crew complement being pilot, instructor and air signaller. The last Training Command Buckmasters served with the No. 238 OCU at Colerne into the mid-fifties; the transfer of one or two to Filton for experimental work marked its retirement in the mid-1950s.

Operators

 Royal Air Force

Specifications

See also

Notes

References

Notes

Bibliography

 Barnes, C. H. Bristol Aircraft since 1910. London: Putnam, 1964.
 Bridgeman, Leonard. "The Bristol 166 Buckmaster." Jane's Fighting Aircraft of World War II. London: Studio, 1946. .
 Mondey, David. The Hamlyn Concise Guide to British Aircraft of World War II. London: Aerospace Publishing Ltd., 1982 (reprint 1994). .
 Winchester, Jim. The World's Worst Aircraft: From Pioneering Failures to Multimillion Dollar Disasters. London: Amber Books Ltd., 2005. .

Buckmaster
1940s British military trainer aircraft
Mid-wing aircraft
Aircraft first flown in 1944
Twin piston-engined tractor aircraft